A military attaché is a military expert who is attached to a diplomatic mission, often an embassy. This type of attaché post is normally filled by a high-ranking military officer, who retains a commission while serving with an embassy. Opportunities sometimes arise for service in the field with military forces of another sovereign state. The attache has the privileges of a foreign diplomat.

History
An early example, General Edward Stopford Claremont, served as the first British military attaché (at first described as "military commissioner") based in Paris for 25 years from 1856 to 1881. Though based in the embassy, he was attached to the French army command during the Crimean War of 1853–1856 and later campaigns.

The functions of a military attaché are illustrated by actions of U.S. military attachés in Japan around the time of the Russo-Japanese war of 1904–1905. A series of military officers had been assigned to the American diplomatic mission in Tokyo since 1901, when the U.S. and Japan were co-operating closely in response to the Boxer Rebellion of 1899-1901 in China. The military attaché advised the United States Ambassador to Japan on military matters, acted as a liaison between United States Army and the Imperial General Headquarters, and gathered and disseminated intelligence. The military attaché's office in Tokyo usually had two assistants and a number of "language officers" who were assigned specifically to learn Japanese while attached to Imperial Japanese Army regiments as observers. These "language officers" translated training and technical manuals and reported on conditions in Japanese military units.

During the Russo-Japanese War (1904–1905), military attachés from many Western military organizations served as observers with the land and naval forces of Russia and of Japan. The United States Army detailed eight officers to serve as military attachés with opposing forces in the field; and all served from the start of hostilities in 1904 through the signing of the peace protocols in September 1905. After the war, the reports of British officers attached to the Japanese forces in the field were combined and published in four volumes.
During this conflict, some attachés served primarily in Manchuria, and others served primarily in Tokyo. Some, like Italian naval officer Ernesto Burzagli, saw service both at sea and in Tokyo.

The agreed conditions that allow military attachés to gather information can be misunderstood with fatal results. He was reportedly observing from a point not marked off-limits, though near a place that was. According to Sgt. Jessie Schatz, Nicholson's driver, there were no warning shots and the Soviets refused to give Nicholson medical attention for nearly an hour. His role had been agreed to by the United States and the Soviet Union. Soviet liaison-teams were conducting similar missions in West Germany. These tours had evolved into a legalized form of intelligence-gathering, usually accepted by both sides. The killing became a diplomatic incident. In retaliation, the United States expelled Soviet military attaché Stanislav Gromov, who was selected for his effectiveness in collecting intelligence on the United States for the Soviet Union from his post in Washington.

See also
 Arms industry
 Defense Attaché System (US)
 Defence diplomacy
 Diplomat
 Military attachés and observers in the Russo-Japanese War
 Military attachés and war correspondents in the First World War
 Science attaché
 United Nations Military Observer

Notes and references

References

 Craig, Gordon A. "Military diplomats in the Prussian and German service: the attachés, 1816-1914." Political Science Quarterly (1949): 65-94. online

 Cullen, Glen T. (1999).  "Preparing for battle: Learning Lessons in the US Army during World War I."  U.S. Army Command and General Staff College (CGSC),  Combined Arms Research Library.
 _, Office of the Chief of Staff, Second (military) Information Division. (1906). Reports of the Military Observers attached to the Armies in Manchuria during the Russo-Japanese War, Vol. I; (1907). Vol. II. Washington, D.C.: Government Printing Office.
 Hadley, Tim. Military Diplomacy in the Dual Alliance: German Military Attaché Reporting from Vienna, 1879–1914 (Lexington Books, 2015).
 Prout, John. "The origins of the military attaché corps." American Intelligence Journal (2002): 47-55. online
 Sisemore, James D. (2003). "The Russo-Japanese War, Lessons Not Learned."  CGSC.
 _. (1907). The Russo-Japanese War, Reports from British Officers Attached to the Japanese Forces in the Field, Vol. I; (1908). Vol. II. London: General Staff.
 Trumpener, Ulrich. "The Service Attachés and Military Plenipotentiaries of Imperial Germany, 1871–1918." The International History Review 9#4 (1987): 621-638. The Service Attachés and Military Plenipotentiaries of Imperial Germany, 1871–1918

Diplomats by role
Military command staff occupations
Titles